The 1874 South Carolina United States House of Representatives elections were held on November 3, 1874 to select five Representatives for two-year terms from the state of South Carolina.  Two incumbents were re-elected, two open seats were retained by the Republicans, and the open seat in the 2nd congressional district was picked up by the Independent Republicans.  The composition of the state delegation after the election was four Republicans and one Independent Republican.

1st congressional district
Incumbent Republican Congressman Joseph Rainey of the 1st congressional district, in office since 1870, defeated Independent Republican Samuel Lee.

General election results

|-
| bgcolor="#ff00ff" |
| Independent Republican
| Samuel Lee
| align="right" | 13,563
| align="right" | 48.6
| align="right" | +48.6
|-

|-
| 
| colspan=5 |Republican hold
|-

2nd congressional district
Incumbent Republican Congressman Alonzo J. Ransier of the 2nd congressional district, in office since 1873, declined to run for re-election.  Independent Republican Edmund William McGregor Mackey defeated Republican Charles W. Buttz in the general election.

General election results

|-
| bgcolor="#ff00ff" |
| Independent Republican
| Edmund W.M. Mackey
| align="right" | 16,746
| align="right" | 54.1
| align="right" | +29.5
|-

| bgcolor="#ff00ff" |
| colspan=5 |Independent Republican gain from Republican
|-

3rd congressional district Special Election
Incumbent Republican Congressman Robert B. Elliott of the 3rd congressional district, in office since 1871, resigned in 1874 so that he could return to South Carolina and stem the massive corruption on the part of the state Republican Party.  A special election was called to be held simultaneously with the regular election.  Lewis C. Carpenter was nominated by the Republicans and was unopposed in the special election.

General election results

|-
| 
| colspan=5 |Republican hold
|-

3rd congressional district
Solomon L. Hoge was nominated by the Republicans for the regular election of the 3rd congressional district and he defeated Conservative challenger Samuel McGowan.

General election results

|-
| bgcolor="#00FFFF" |
| Conservative
| Samuel McGowan
| align="right" | 12,873
| align="right" | 43.9
| align="right" | +43.9
|-

|-
| 
| colspan=5 |Republican hold
|-

4th congressional district
Incumbent Republican Congressman Alexander S. Wallace of the 4th congressional district, in office since 1870, defeated Conservative challenger Joseph B. Kershaw.

General election results

|-
| bgcolor="#00FFFF" |
| Conservative
| Joseph B. Kershaw
| align="right" | 14,455
| align="right" | 46.8
| align="right" | +46.8
|-

|-
| 
| colspan=5 |Republican hold
|-

5th congressional district
Robert Smalls was nominated by the Republicans for the newly created 5th congressional district and he defeated Independent Republican J.P.M. Epping.

General election results

|-
| bgcolor="#ff00ff" |
| Independent Republican
| J.P.M. Epping
| align="right" | 4,461
| align="right" | 19.9
| align="right" | N/A
|-

|-
| 
| colspan=5 |Republican gain
|-

See also
United States House of Representatives elections, 1874
South Carolina gubernatorial election, 1874
South Carolina's congressional districts

References
"Report of the Secretary of State to the General Assembly of South Carolina." Reports and Resolutions of the General Assembly of the State of South Carolina at the Regular Session, 1873-'74. Columbia, SC: Republican Printing Company, 1874, pp. 86–88.

1874
South Carolina
United States House of Representatives